Molly Lewis (born 28 October 1989) is a basketball player from Australia. She has played for the Australian Institute of Sport, Sydney Uni Flames and Canberra Capitals in Australia's WNBL.

Personal
Lewis is originally from Tasmania. She did not play basketball during the 2010/2011 season because she felt like it was an obligation. She has a brother and a sister. While playing for Sydney, she attended the Australian College of Physical Education and studied physical education.

Basketball

Juniors
Lewis played her junior basketball in Tasmania and New South Wales.

Australian Institute of Sport
In 2005, Lewis was playing for the Australian Institute of Sport's WNBL team. She played in a preseason game for the team against the Canberra Capitals. She also played for the team during the 2006/2007 season.

Sydney Uni Flames
Lewis played for the Sydney Uni Flames for three seasons. She first joined the team for the 2007/2008 season.

Canberra Capitals
For the Capitals, Lewis wears number 9 and plays forward. She signed a one-year contract with the Capitals to play for them during the 2011/2012 season. She got the contract because Alison Lacey decided to not play basketball for the Capitals during the season. Michelle Cosier's pre-season injury was an opportunity for the Capitals to get a better look at Lewis. She played in a pre-season game against the Sydney Uni Flames that Canberra lost.  This was the first real opportunity the team's coaches had to see her play with the team. In an October 2011 game for the Capitals, she scored 11 points against the Rangers. In a December 2011 game against the Bulleen Boomers, she fouled out.

SEABL
Lewis played for a Launceston Tornadoes team in the SEABL with Capitals teammate Nicole Hunt in 2011. Carrie Graf saw this as an opportunity for her to grow as a player.

National team
Lewis was a member of the Australian junior national team in 2007 and played in the World Championships. She played 17 total games for the junior national team.

Adelaide Link Lightning
Lewis currently plays for Adelaide Lightning.

Coaching
Lewis was a development coach for the New South Wales Under 16 Women Country team in 2010.

References

External links

 Molly Lewis: WNBL

Canberra Capitals players
Living people
Australian women's basketball players
1989 births
Forwards (basketball)
Sydney Uni Flames players
Australian Institute of Sport basketball (WNBL) players